Fernando Mamede Mendes (15 July 1937 – 31 March 2016) was a Portuguese football midfielder and manager.

Playing career
Mendes was born in Seia, Guarda District. During his professional career, which lasted 13 seasons, he played almost exclusively for Sporting CP, also starting and finishing his football development at the Lisbon side. He appeared in 233 matches during his spell, including friendlies.

Mendes represented the Portugal national team for six years, but did not attend any major international tournament. On 25 April 1965, he broke his leg in the early minutes of the away fixture against Czechoslovakia for the 1966 FIFA World Cup qualification as the national team eventually won it 1–0 thanks to Eusébio, with ten players (no substitutions were allowed then).

Coaching career
Mendes never fully recovered from that situation, and retired four years later at only 31. In 24 Primeira Liga games over three separate seasons, he served as interim manager at his only club (the last in late 2000-early 2001), winning nine, drawing nine and losing six; with the Lions, he also worked as an assistant coach and extensively with the youth teams.

Death
Mendes died on 31 March 2016 at the Hospital Pulido Valente in Lisbon, after a long illness. He was 78 years old.

References

External links

1937 births
2016 deaths
People from Seia
Portuguese footballers
Association football midfielders
Primeira Liga players
Sporting CP footballers
Atlético Clube de Portugal players
Portugal international footballers
Portuguese football managers
Primeira Liga managers
Liga Portugal 2 managers
SC Vianense managers
Sporting CP managers
C.S. Marítimo managers
C.F. Os Belenenses managers
S.C. Farense managers
C.D. Trofense managers
Sportspeople from Guarda District